The Institute of American Indian Arts (IAIA) is a public tribal land-grant college in Santa Fe, New Mexico. The college focuses on Native American art.  It operates the Museum of Contemporary Native Arts (MoCNA), which is housed in the historic Santa Fe Federal Building (the old Post Office), a landmark Pueblo Revival building listed on the National Register of Historic Places as Federal Building. The museum houses the National Collection of Contemporary Indian Art, with more than 7,000 items.

History
The Institute of American Indian Arts was co-founded by Lloyd Kiva New (Cherokee, 1916–2002) and Dr. George Boyce in 1962 with funding from the Bureau of Indian Affairs. The school was founded upon the recommendation of the BIA Department of Education and the Indian Arts and Crafts Board. Three factors led to the school's founding: growing dissatisfaction with the academic program at the Santa Fe Indian School, the BIA's emerging interest in higher education, and the influence of the Southwest Indian Art Project and the Rockefeller Foundation.

IAIA began on the SFIS campus in October 1962. From 1962 to 1979, IAIA ran a high school program, and began offering college- and graduate-level art courses in 1975. In 1986, the Institute of American Indian and Alaska Native Culture and Arts Development was congressionally chartered as a nonprofit organization, similar to the structure of the Smithsonian Institution, which separated the school from the BIA. It was designated a land-grant college in 1994 alongside 31 other tribal colleges. In 2001, the school was accredited, including the accreditation of four year degrees. A two-year low-residency MFA in creative writing was accredited in 2013.

IAIA Museum of Contemporary Native Arts

In 1991 the college founded the Institute of American Indian Arts Museum, now the IAIA Museum of Contemporary Native Arts (MoCNA), in downtown Santa Fe, with a focus on contemporary intertribal Native American art, the MoCNA is housed in the historic Santa Fe Federal Building (the old Post Office), a landmark Pueblo Revival building listed on the National Register of Historic Places. The museum also features the Allan Houser Sculpture Garden.

Partnerships
IAIA is a member of the American Indian Higher Education Consortium, which includes tribally and federally chartered institutions working to strengthen tribal nations and make a difference in the lives of American Indians and Alaska Natives. IAIA generally serves geographically isolated populations of Native Americans that have few other means of accessing education beyond the high school level.

During the early 1970s, faculty member Ed Wapp, Jr.'s E-Yah-Pah-Hah Chanters toured nationally with the Hanay Geiogamah's American Indian Theatre Ensemble, a company in residence at La MaMa Experimental Theatre Club in New York City. A program from this tour describes the musical ensemble as "students from the Institute of American Indian Arts at Santa Fe, N.M., and are under the direction of Ed Wapp, Jr. Their music is presented in both the traditional and contemporary American Indian forms. Songs are selected from the Plains, Eastern, Great Basin, Southwest and Northwest Coast areas of Indian Country."

Notable faculty

 Imogene Goodshot Arquero, Oglala Lakota beadwork artist
Louis W. Ballard, Quapaw/Cherokee composer
Gregory Cajete, Santa Clara Pueblo ethnobiologist and author
Karita Coffey, Comanche ceramist
Jon Davis, European-American poet
Lois Ellen Frank, cultural anthropologist and food historian 
Allan Houser, Chiricahua Apache sculptor
Charles Loloma, Hopi jeweler
Otellie Loloma, Hopi potter, sculptor, painter
Linda Lomahaftewa, Hopi/Choctaw printmaker
Larry McNeil, Tlingit/Nisga'a photographer
 N. Scott Momaday, Kiowa writer
 Josephine Myers-Wapp, Comanche textile artist
 Wendy Ponca, Osage Nation fashion designer and textile artist
Fritz Scholder, Luiseño painter
Arthur Sze, Chinese-American poet
James Thomas Stevens, Akwesasne Mohawk poet and writer
Azalea Thorpe; an award for the fiber arts program is named in her honor 
Charlene Teters, Spokane painter and installation artist
Gerald Vizenor, White Earth Ojibwe writer
Ed Wapp, Jr. musician; son of Josephine Myers-Wapp
 Will Wilson, Diné photographer
 Elizabeth Woody, Navajo/Tenino (Warm Springs)/Wasco-Yakama artist and author
Melanie Yazzie, Navajo printmaker
 William S. Yellow Robe, Jr., Assiniboine writer

Notable alumni

 Marcus Amerman, Choctaw Nation beadwork artist
 Ralph Aragon, Pueblo painter and sculptor
 Katie Doane Tulugaq Avery, Iñupiaq filmmaker
 Alexandra Backford, Aleut painter
 Esther Belin, Diné multimedia artist and writer
 Sherwin Bitsui, Navajo poet
 Diane Burns, Anishinaabe/Chemehuevi poet
 Jackie Larson Bread, Blackfoot beadwork artist
 T.C. Cannon (Kiowa/Caddo, 1946–1978), painter and printmaker
 Sherman Chaddlesone (Kiowa, 1947–2013), painter
 Eddie Chuculate, Muscogee/Cherokee author and journalist
 Kelly Church, Odawa/Ojibwe/Potawatomi basket maker, birchbark biter
 Karita Coffey, Comanche ceramic artist
 Bunky Echo-Hawk, Pawnee/Yakama painter
 Anita Fields, Osage/Muskogee ceramicist
 Bill Glass Jr., Cherokee Nation ceramic artist and sculptor
 Gina Gray (Osage, 1954–2014), printmaker and painter
 Benjamin Harjo Jr., Shawnee/Seminole painter and printmaker
 Joy Harjo, Muscogee poet and jazz musician, US Poet Laureate
 Allison Hedge Coke, American author
 Kevin Locke, Lakota/Anishinaabe hoop dancer
 Gerald McMaster, Plains Cree Siksika First Nation author, artist, and curator
 Melissa Melero-Moose, Northern Paiute/Modoc mixed-media artist, curator, and cofounder of the Great Basin Native Artists
 America Meredith, Cherokee Nation painter, printmaker, and curator
 Dan Namingha, Hopi-Tewa painter and sculptor
 Jody Naranjo, Santa Clara Pueblo potter
 Jamie Okuma, Luiseño/Shoshone-Bannock beadwork artist and fashion designer
 Tommy Orange, Cheyenne-Arapaho best-selling novelist
 Mary Gay Osceola, Seminole painter and printmaker
 Chris Pappan (Kaw/Osage/Cheyenne River Lakota), ledger artist
 Kevin Red Star, Crow painter
 Layli Long Soldier, Oglala Lakota poet, writer, and artist.
 James Thomas Stevens, Akwesasne Mohawk poet
 Roxanne Swentzell, Santa Clara Pueblo ceramic artist and sculptor
 Charlene Teters, Spokane painter and installation artist
 Randy'L He-dow Teton, Shoshone-Bannock model for Sacajawea Gold Dollar coin
 Hulleah Tsinhnahjinnie, Seminole/Muscogee/Diné photographer, writer, curator, and educator
 Marty Two Bulls Sr, Lakota artist
 Marie Watt, Seneca textile artist, printmaker and conceptual artist
 Terese Marie Mailhot, Sto:lo writer
 Jolene Yazzie, Navajo graphic designer
 Debra Yepa-Pappan, Jemez Pueblo/Korean digital multimedia artist and museum professional
 Alfred Young Man, PhD (Chippewa-Cree), painter, author, professor
Vernon Bigman, Abstract Painter

Notable administration and staff
 Lloyd Kiva New (Cherokee, 1916–2002), co-founder and president
Joseph Sanchez, curator and artist, one of the Indian Group of Seven
Duane Slick, (born 1961) painter, taught at IAIA from 1992 until 1995.

See also 

 C.N. Gorman Museum, similar to the IAIA Museum of Contemporary Native Arts, and has a contemporary intertribal Native art focus.

References

External links

 
Native American arts organizations
Native American museums in New Mexico
American Indian Higher Education Consortium
Art museums and galleries in New Mexico
Art schools in New Mexico
Buildings and structures in Santa Fe, New Mexico
Education in Santa Fe, New Mexico
Museums in Santa Fe, New Mexico
Native Americans in Santa Fe, New Mexico
Pueblo Revival architecture in Santa Fe, New Mexico
School buildings on the National Register of Historic Places in New Mexico
Public universities and colleges in New Mexico
University museums in New Mexico
National Register of Historic Places in Santa Fe, New Mexico
Federal buildings in the United States
1962 establishments in New Mexico
Educational institutions established in 1962
1962 in art